Lasius bureni is a species of ant belonging to the genus Lasius, formerly a part of the subgenus Acanthomyops. Described in 1968 by Wing, the species is native to the United States.

References

External links

bureni
Hymenoptera of North America
Insects of the United States
Insects described in 1968